This is a list of electoral division results for the 2010 Australian federal election for the state of Western Australia.

Overall

Results by division

Brand

Canning

Cowan

Curtin

Durack

Forrest

Fremantle

Hasluck

Moore

O'Connor

Pearce

Perth

Stirling

Swan

Tangney

See also 
 Results of the 2010 Australian federal election (House of Representatives)
 Post-election pendulum for the 2010 Australian federal election
 Members of the Australian House of Representatives, 2010–2013

Notes

References 

Western Australia 2010